Jerry or Gerry Black may refer to:

Jerry Black, see Gulf Breeze UFO incident
Gerry Black, character in Man of Steel (musical)
Gerry Black, actor in The Majestic (film)

See also
Jeremy Black (disambiguation)
Jeremiah Black (1810–1883), American statesman and lawyer
Gerard Black, musician
Gerald Black, fictional character